Sebastian Santa Maria (September 24, 1959-October 20, 1996) was a Chilean-Swiss musician. He was born in 1959 in Santiago, Chile, but settled in Lausanne, Switzerland at age 17.

He played the piano in several clubs in Lausanne until beginning a fertile career as a composer, composing a number of songs including some made for Catherine Lara, Bernard Lavilliers, for Viktor Lazlo's album My Delicious Poisons and Isabelle Adjani.

Beside these composer activities, he also played numerous piano duet jazz concerts with François Lindemann, and a few years later he founded with Lindemann a unique group of seven Steinways called Piano Seven.

He also participated on the reincarnation of British band The Zombies, playing on their 1991 album, New World. As a solo artist, he released a few singles and one full-length album (Latino, 1994). A second album, Corpus, was released posthumously in 1997.

Santa Maria died of adrenoleukodystrophy in 1996 in Lausanne.

External links
 Official webpage
 Discography 
 Latino

1959 births
1996 deaths
Swiss male composers
Chilean composers
Chilean male composers
20th-century male musicians
The Lucky Strikes members
The Zombies members
20th-century Swiss composers